Deh-e Khvajeh (also Romanized as Deh-e Khvājeh and Deh Khvājeh) is a village in Javar Rural District, in the Central District of Kuhbanan County, Kerman Province, Iran. At the 2006 census, its population was 67, in 19 families.

References 

Populated places in Kuhbanan County